Sergey Tarasovich Kravtsov (born 15 February 1948) is a retired Ukrainian cyclist. He competed at the 1968, 1972 and 1976 Summer Olympics in four events in total. His best achievement was fifth place in the sprint in 1976. He won two silver medals in this event at the world championships in 1971 and 1974. In 1974, he also won the Grand Prix de Copenhagen, a major international track competition of those years.

References 

1948 births
Living people
Ukrainian male cyclists
Soviet male cyclists
Olympic cyclists of the Soviet Union
Cyclists at the 1968 Summer Olympics
Cyclists at the 1972 Summer Olympics
Cyclists at the 1976 Summer Olympics
Sportspeople from Kharkiv